Revelation is a solo cover album released in 2006 by actor and singer Christopher Lee. A music video for the song "My Way" (originally written by Paul Anka) was released, featuring Lee in and around his home in Cadogan Square.

Track listing 
Previously Unreleased Track "Alexander Townley – The Pum" – 7:06
"The Impossible Dream (The Quest)" – 3:28
"I, Don Quixote – Man of la Mancha" – 3:42
"Carmencita – Quiero y no quiero querer" – 4:06
"The Toreador March – Flamenco Mix" – 5:21
"O Sole Mio – It's Now or Never" 3:51
"High Noon" – 2:23
"Wanderin' Star" – 3:44
"Oh What a Beautiful Mornin'" – 2:58
"Name Your Poison" – 3:13
"Toreador March – Heavy Metal Mix" – 4:39
"The Little Drummer Boy" – 3:02
"Silent Night" – 2:59
"My Way" – 4:34
Behind the Music – with Christopher Lee – 22:20

References

[ Revelation] at Allmusic

External links
 

2006 albums
Christopher Lee albums
Covers albums
Pop albums by British artists